This is a list of fossiliferous stratigraphic units in Ivory Coast.



See also 
 Lists of fossiliferous stratigraphic units in Africa
 List of fossiliferous stratigraphic units in Ghana
 List of fossiliferous stratigraphic units in Guinea
 Geology of Ivory Coast

References

Further reading 
 S. Barta-Calmus. 1969. Études paléontologiques et géologiques sur le Falaises de Fresco (Côte d'Ivoire). Bulletin du Muséum national d'histoire naturelle 41(3):817-832

Ivory Coast
Paleontology in Ivory Coast
Ivory Coast
Fossiliferous stratigraphic units
Fossil